The University of Washington School of Medicine (UWSOM) is a large public medical school in the northwest United States, located in Seattle and affiliated with the University of Washington. According to U.S. News & World Reports 2022 Best Graduate School rankings, University of Washington School of Medicine ranked #1 in the nation for primary care education, and #7 for research. 

UWSOM is the first public medical school in the states of Washington, Wyoming, Alaska, Montana, and Idaho.  The school maintains a network of teaching facilities in more than 100 towns and cities across the five-state region. As part of this "WWAMI" partnership, medical students from Wyoming, Alaska, Montana, and Idaho spend their first year and a half at the University of Wyoming, the University of Alaska Anchorage, Montana State University, or the University of Idaho, respectively. In addition, sixty students in each class are based at Gonzaga University in Spokane, Washington. Preference is given to residents of the WWAMI states.

UW Medicine 
UW Medicine includes the UWSOM, as well as a number of clinical facilities owned and operated by the UW, including the following:
Harborview Medical Center — Seattle
University of Washington Medical Center — Seattle
Northwest Hospital & Medical Center — Seattle
Valley Medical Center — Renton
UW Medicine Neighborhood Clinics — nine primary care facilities
UW School of Medicine
UW Physicians — a physician practice
Airlift Northwest — a medical transport system for Washington, Alaska, Montana and Idaho
In addition, UW Medicine shares in the ownership and governance of Children’s University Medical Group and Seattle Cancer Care Alliance, a partnership between UW Medicine, Fred Hutchinson Cancer Research Center and Seattle Children's.

History
The school was founded in 1946 as the 76th medical school in the country and is a leader in primary care, family medicine, biomedical research, experimental therapy, clinical treatments, and academic medicine. In 2014, the UW School of Medicine was ranked #10 in research and #1 in primary care and in rural medicine by U.S. News & World Report. The UW School of Medicine also ranks as one of the top medical schools in receipt of federal researching funding, having been awarded $712.3 million in grants by the National Institutes of Health in 2009. Only Harvard Medical School was awarded more federal funding.

In May 2013, it was announced that UW Medicine and PeaceHealth were coming together in a "strategic affiliation." The American Civil Liberties Union criticized the merger as PeaceHealth is "directed by the Catholic Ethical and Religious Directives" and UW Medicine is taxpayer-funded.

WWAMI 

WWAMI is an anacronym for Washington, Wyoming, Alaska, Montana, Idaho. The WWAMI program is a collection of states and universities that have agreed to a collaboration of facilties, people, and funding to enhance the region's access to education. The University of Washington WWAMI program is set in six cities across the five state region with the institutional partners and class size of each campus listed below. Each campus is supported both by the University of Washington and the partner institution. During the clinical phase of the curriculum, clinical sites are found within all five WWAMI states and students from each campus have the opportunity to rotate throughout the region.

Previously, the Alaska campus was associated with the University of Alaska Fairbanks, and the Spokane site was associated with Washington State University. The Spokane campus partnership was established with Gonzaga University when Washington State University established the Elson S Floyd College of Medicine in Spokane.

Notable alumni 

 Benjamin Danielson 
 Diana L. Farmer, Pearl Stamps Stewart Professor of Surgery and chair of the Department of Surgery at the University of California, Davis and surgeon-in-chief of UC Davis Children's Hospital 
 Brian S. Kim,  Sol and Clara Kest Professor, Vice Chair of Research, and Site Chair of Mount Sinai West and Morningside in the Kimberly and Eric J. Waldman Department of Dermatology at Icahn School of Medicine at Mount Sinai

See also
List of medical schools in the United States
WWAMI Regional Medical Education Program
Elson S. Floyd College of Medicine

References

External links

Medicine
Medical schools in Washington (state)
Educational institutions established in 1946
1946 establishments in Washington (state)